The Kavvayi river basin is located between 120 05’ to 120 15’ North latitude and 750 05 ‘ to 750 20’ East longitude. It spread over the district of Kannur and Kasargod. It has a total area of 164.76 km2 covering 14 villages spread over 9 local bodies in the two districts. Kavvayi river or Thattar river emerges from the Cheemeni Kunnu at elevation 114 m. above MSL having the length of 31 km and join directly to Kavvai backwater. Kavvayi river is typical among the 14 midland originated rivers in Kerala. It has a watershed area confined to midland hillocks and their valley. Kavvayi River includes five rivers, the Kavvayi River, and its tributaries- Kankol, Vannathichal, Kuppithodu, and Kuniyan – flows together to form the Kavvayi Backwaters.

Rivers of Kasaragod district